The Regius Professor of Natural History is a Regius Professorship at the University of Aberdeen in Scotland. It was originally called the Regius Professor of Civil and Natural History at Marischal College until in 1860 Marischal College and King's Colleges merged to form the University of Aberdeen, and the title changed to Natural History.

References

Natural History
Natural History
Natural history